Tarampa is a rural locality in the Somerset Region, Queensland, Australia.

History 
The locality presumably takes its name from its parish, which in turn was named after the Tarampa pastoral run named in 1847 by pastoralist Charles Cameron. The name is from the Yuggera language, meaning wild lime tree.

In 1877,  were resumed from the Tarampa pastoral run and offered for selection on 19 April 1877.

Tarampa Provisional School opened on 1 April 1880. On 1 July 1886 it became Tarampa State School.

During World War II a military airfield was located at nearby Mount Tarampa called Lowood. The United States Army Air Forces based its 80th Fighter Squadron (8th Fighter Group) between 28 March – 10 May 1942), flying P-39 Airacobras.  The airfield no longer exists but a small memorial marks its previous location.

The Lowood circuit built at the former airfield site was the venue for the 1960 Australian Grand Prix. The facility has since been closed and the land redeveloped.

Heritage listings 
Tarampa has heritage-listed sites, including:
 18 Manthey Road: Tarampa State School

Education

Tarampa State School is a government primary (Prep-6) school for boys and girls at 18 Manthey Road. In 2017, the school had an enrolment of 87 students with 7 teachers (5 full-time equivalent) and 6 non-teaching staff (4 full-time equivalent).

See also
 United States Army Air Forces in Australia (World War II)

References

Attribution

External links

 

Airfields of the United States Army Air Forces in Australia
Suburbs of Somerset Region
Defunct airports in Queensland
Queensland in World War II
Localities in Queensland